Jadranka Stojaković (24 July 1950 – 3 May 2016) was a Bosnian singer-songwriter popular in the former Yugoslavia, known for her unique voice. Her best known hits are "Sve smo mogli mi", "Što te nema", and "Bistre vode Bosnom teku".

Biography
Stojaković was born in Sarajevo to a family of school teachers. Her infancy was spent in a small village near Bosanski Novi where her parents got assigned to teach. Her parents soon divorced and she moved with her mother back to Sarajevo. Over the subsequent few years, the two were continually on the move — throughout Yugoslav towns and communities experiencing shortages of primary school teachers where her mother would get work — Dubrovnik, Gradac na Moru, Vareš, etc. Mother and daughter eventually settled in various villages around Sarajevo, which is where young Jadranka spent a notable part of her childhood.

At the age of 16, Stojaković joined her uncle Vukašin Radulović's jazz group and performed with them throughout the country as well other parts of Europe (mostly Germany). In 1981 she sang backing vocals with Ismeta Dervoz for Yugoslav representative Vajta at the 1981 Eurovision Song Contest in Ireland. At the 1984 Winter Olympics, held in her native Sarajevo, she sang the official theme song of the Games. Around that time, she was awarded the prize for SFR Yugoslavia's best artist. 

She resided in Japan from 1988 until 2011. In 2009, she suffered an accident on stage, tripping over a cable during a concert. She was diagnosed with an amyotrophic lateral sclerosis (ALS), a motor neuron disease. After receiving a small compensation for her injury, Stojaković moved back to Bosnia and continued to battle the disability. In addition, Stojaković was in dispute with Bosnian officials to regain her property, an apartment in Sarajevo that was taken away from her while she was abroad. Nonetheless, she was determined to compose and write more music.

After her return from Japan, Stojaković performed several pre-scheduled concerts in 2011 and began working as an executive at the Radio Televizija Republike Srpske (RTRS) music production in Banja Luka. Her compilation album Boje zvuka was released by RTRS in 2013.

As she grew increasingly ill, Stojaković eventually retreated to a nursing home in Banja Luka, Bosnia and Herzegovina. She died in the nursing home on  3 May 2016.  She was buried on 9 May 2016 in Vrbanja, a suburb of Banja Luka.

Discography

Albums
 Svitanje (Dawn), LP 8018, Diskoton Sarajevo, 1981.
 Da odmoriš malo dušu (Rest Your Soul a Little), LP 8052, Diskoton, Sarajevo, 1982.
 Sve te više volim (I love you more and more), LP 3149, Sarajevo disk, Sarajevo, 1985.
 Vjerujem (I believe) LP 2122677, PGP RTB Belgrade, 1987.
 Sarajevo balada CD SC4106, Omagatoki Records, 1994.
 Baby Universe, Omagatoki Records, 1996.
 音色 = Otoiro - Adriatic Muse On The Cruise, Omagatoki Records, 2007.
 Daleko (Far Away), Croatia Records, 2011.

References

External links

1950 births
2016 deaths
Bosnia and Herzegovina people of Serbian descent
Bosnia and Herzegovina people of Croatian descent
Singers from Sarajevo
20th-century Bosnia and Herzegovina women singers
Yugoslav women singers
20th-century Japanese women singers
20th-century Japanese singers
Sevdalinka
Eurovision Song Contest entrants of 1981
Eurovision Song Contest entrants for Yugoslavia
University of Sarajevo alumni
Deaths from motor neuron disease
Neurological disease deaths in Bosnia and Herzegovina
Bosnia and Herzegovina expatriates in Japan